VGR may refer to:

 Star Trek: Voyager, a science fiction television series
 Vaghri language, an Indic language of Pakistan
 Vale of Glamorgan Railway, a Welsh railway preservation society
 Victorian Goldfields Railway, a railway in Victoria, Australia